Asif Khan (born 28 November 1989) is a Hong Kong cricketer.  Khan is a right-handed batsman who bowls right-arm medium pace.

Having played age group cricket for Hong Kong Under-19s in the 2010 Under-19 World Cup, he proceeded to make his World Cricket League debut for Hong Kong in the 2011 World Cricket League Division Three, where he helped Hong Kong earn promotion to 2011 World Cricket League Division Two.  It was in this tournament that he made his List A debut against Uganda.  He played 2 further List A matches in the competition, against Bermuda and Papua New Guinea.  In his 3 matches, he took 3 wickets at a bowling average of 30.33, with best figures of 2/46.

References

External links
Asif Khan at ESPNcricinfo
Asif Khan at CricketArchive

1989 births
Living people
Hong Kong people
Hong Kong cricketers
Cricketers at the 2010 Asian Games
Asian Games competitors for Hong Kong